Diego Francolino da Silva, known as Diego Silva (born 9 May 1989), is a Brazilian footballer who plays for Marcílio Dias as a defensive midfielder.

Career
Born in Bento de Abreu, São Paulo, Diego Silva began his senior career with Genus, but later moved to Operário Ltda. A year later he signed with XV de Piracicaba.

In August 2012 Diego Silva joined Grêmio Barueri on loan until the end of the season. He made his professional debut on 14 August, playing the last 14 minutes of a 2–0 home win over Goiás.

On 2 May 2013 Diego Silva signed with Flamengo, also on loan; he made his Série A debut on 8 June, starting in a 3–0 away success over Criciúma. Diego Silva also appeared in the 2013 Copa do Brasil finals, as a second-half substitute in each leg.

On 8 January 2014 Diego Silva signed on loan with Portuguesa.

Honours
Club
Campeonato Paulista Série A2: 2011
Copa do Brasil: 2013

References

External links

1989 births
Living people
Footballers from São Paulo (state)
Brazilian footballers
Association football midfielders
Campeonato Brasileiro Série A players
Campeonato Brasileiro Série B players
Campeonato Brasileiro Série C players
Esporte Clube XV de Novembro (Piracicaba) players
Grêmio Barueri Futebol players
CR Flamengo footballers
Associação Portuguesa de Desportos players
Guarani FC players
América Futebol Clube (RN) players
Associação Desportiva Cabofriense players
Sampaio Corrêa Futebol Clube players
Atlético Clube Goianiense players
Clube Atlético Linense players
Treze Futebol Clube players
Clube Náutico Marcílio Dias players